= Maple Fork, West Virginia =

Maple Fork
- Unincorporated community
- Location within the state of West Virginia Maple Fork (the United States)
- Coordinates: 37°52′16″N 81°13′50″W
- Country: United States
- State: West Virginia
- County: Raleigh
- Elevation: 2,054 ft (626 m)
- Time zone: UTC-5 (Eastern (EST))
  - Summer (DST): UTC-4 (EDT)
- GNIS ID: 1555041

Maple Fork is an unincorporated community in Raleigh County, West Virginia, United States.
